The East Fremantle Football Club Hall of Fame was launched on 2 July 2012 when 52 inductees were celebrated during a dinner at the East Fremantle Football Club Social Hall. Despite being the most successful team in the West Australian Football League, the East Fremantle Football Club had never had a Hall of Fame, the closest being the 1997 Team of the Century, created to celebrate the club's 100th year.

Legends
In the inaugural 2012 Hall of Fame ceremony the following nine players/officials were given 'Legends' status.

Brian Peake
George Doig
Jack "Stork" Clarke
Merv Cowan
Jack Sheedy
John "Jerry" Dolan
W.J "Nipper" Truscott
Tom Wilson
David "Dolly" Christy

Inductees
The 2012 ceremony saw 52 individuals inducted. 
The 52 members of the Hall of Fame served the club as players, officials or volunteers. 
To be eligible for the Hall of Fame, inductees must have played or volunteered between 1898 and 1986.

Legends indicated in bold.

References

East Fremantle Football Club
Australian rules football museums and halls of fame
2012 establishments in Australia
Halls of fame in Western Australia